Dulene is a village in Pivara municipality in Kragujevac city district in the Šumadija District of central Serbia.  

It has a population of 218.

History 
The first families settled in Dulene in the late 18th and early 19th centuries. After the Second Serbian Uprising, Dulene administratively belongs to Levаč.

References

External links
Satellite map at Maplandia.com
Dulene website

Populated places in Šumadija District
Kragujevac